The Aparai or Apalai are an indigenous people of Brazil, who live in Amapá and Pará states. A little community is located in French Guiana, in Antecume Pata. They were sedentary slash-and-burn farmers, necessitating periodic relocation as soil became exhausted, but also hunters and gatherers. They spoke a Carib language and in the 20th century their subsistence shifted towards craftwork as they adapted to modern Brazil and the cash economy.

Name
The tribe calls themselves Aparai. They have been known by Apalai, Appirois, Aparathy, Apareilles, Apalaii, Aparis and Apalaís.

Language
Most Aparai people are multi-lingual, and many speak Aparai, Wayana, Portuguese, and Tiriyó, as well as  Wajãpi, Aluku, and Criollo. The Aparai language is one of the Karib languages.

Population
In 1993, they numbered 450, and in 2014, there are 564 Apalai people. They usually live with the Wayana. The main group lives along the East Paru River in Brazil within Tumucumaque Indigenous Park and the East Paru Indigenous Land. A small group lives along the Maroni River in French Guiana. An even smaller group lives along the Tapanahoni River in Suriname.

Most settlements are small except for Aldeia Bona which was founded by FUNAI to concentrate the population of the Apalaí and Wayana. There are 18 settlements.

 Aldeia Bona, Pará
 Antecume Pata, French Guiana
 Missão Tiriyó, Pará
 Paloemeu, Suriname
 Suisuimënë, Pará
 Twenkë, French Guiana

Notes

External links
 Apalai - History and Cultural Relations

Indigenous peoples in Brazil
Indigenous peoples in French Guiana
Indigenous peoples in Suriname
Indigenous peoples of the Guianas